Call 911 is a television show that premiered as a Court TV special on August 21, 2007, and began airing as a series on July 30, 2008 on Investigation Discovery.  The series began airing on Discovery Fit & Health in February 2011.  Each episode documents real 911 calls from people in trouble to emergency dispatchers.  Call 911 was initially picked up as a twenty-episode series, but Investigation Discovery ordered a second season which consisted of 40 additional episodes.

References

External links
Call 911

American non-fiction television series
2007 American television series debuts
Investigation Discovery original programming
2012 American television series endings